Ace Telephone, operating more recently as Ace Communication Group is a telephone cooperative headquartered in Houston, Minnesota. It is a telephone company which also offers local and long distance, Internet services, Security services, PC Repair, IT Consulting and digital TV service; it operates in small towns and rural areas. It serves parts of Houston, Fillmore, and Winona Counties in Minnesota; in Iowa, it serves parts of  Allamakee, Winneshiek, and Fayette Counties. It also owns and operates Ace Telephone Company of Michigan, Inc,  in Mesick, Michigan serving northwestern Michigan in the Wexford, Manistee and Benzie County region and Allendale, Michigan serving  Michigan in the Ottawa region. Plus, Ace Link Telecommunications, Inc. which serves the city of Caledonia, Minnesota.

As an internet service provider, it also has non-telephone customers within its local dialing area. For internet service, in some parts, especially rural ones, it is the only ISP available.

It was formed in 1950 as a rural cooperative to improve telephone service in Fillmore County, Minnesota. It subsequently absorbed a number of other small providers. In 1956 it adopted the "Ace" name. Currently, it has over 24,000 subscribers.

Service area

Iowa
Castalia
Clermont
Fort Atkinson
Harpers Ferry
Highlandville
New Albin
Ossian
Waterville

Michigan
Buckley
Copemish
Hoxeyville
Mesick
South Boardman
Thompsonville
Old Mission
Allendale
Coopersville
Grand Haven
Hudsonville
Jenison
West Olive
Zeeland

Minnesota
Brownsville
Canton
Dakota
Eitzen
Granger
Hokah
Houston
LaCrescent
Lanesboro
Ostrander
Peterson
Rushford
Caledonia

References

External links
Official website
Ace cable internet broadband plans

Companies based in Minnesota
Economy of the Midwestern United States
Telecommunications companies of the United States
Internet service providers of the United States
Cooperatives in the United States